Westfield North Lakes is a shopping centre in North Lakes on the northern outskirts of Brisbane. The centre first opened in on 7 August 2003 and initially included around 80 stores including Target and Coles. In early 2007, construction began on a major extension that was set to bring the total number of stores in the centre to over 200. The extension was opened to the public in October of the same year, including Big W and Woolworths stores and a food court which replaced the old one that was demolished due to the expansion. In May 2008, the centre's 2-level Myer store was opened, which replaced the Myer store in Strathpine Centre that closed in 2007. IKEA opened their second Queensland store at Westfield North Lakes in November 2016. Stage 3 also has 60 additional stores, including Kmart, Rebel Sport, JB HI-FI and Cotton On.

References

Westfield Group
Shopping centres in Queensland
Shopping malls established in 2003
Buildings and structures in Moreton Bay Region